Gareth Koch (born 6 April 1962) is an Australian classical guitarist and recording artist of German/Anglo-Irish/ Lithuanian heritage.

Biography
Gareth Koch was born in Milan to novelist Christopher Koch and Irene Vilnonis, a Conservatorium-trained pianist. Gareth was raised in Sydney, Melbourne, Launceston and various European cities. Koch began to study guitar in Spain at the age of twelve. He made his recording debut in Vienna.

Koch studied music performance at the New South Wales State Conservatorium of Music in Sydney, graduating with a Bachelor of Music degree in 1987. He subsequently won scholarships to complete postgraduate study in classical guitar at the Madrid Royal Conservatory, gaining a Diploma of Music, and at the University of Music and Performing Arts, Vienna. He later completed a PhD in Music at the University of Newcastle, with a thesis exploring the nature of creativity and the workings of the unconscious mind during the act of creation.

Following 10 years in Vienna, Koch was signed by Artworks Recorded Music in 1996 for whom he released several solo albums. Since then he has toured extensively in Europe, North America and Asia. He changed labels to ABC Classics Australia in 2003 and has subsequently released further solo albums. One of these was his controversial transcription of Carl Orff's Carmina Burana.

Koch founded a guitar quartet with fellow Australian musicians Antony Field, Karin Schaupp and Slava Grigoryan to release albums under the group name Saffire. In 2003 he won an ARIA Music Award for Best Classical Album with this ensemble.

Koch is currently Director of the Tasmanian Studio, specialising in developing the talent of aspiring guitarists. He is a founding member of the Australian Guitar Trio with fellow guitarists Oliver Marshall and David Malone.

References

1962 births
Australian classical guitarists
Australian male guitarists
Living people
Academic staff of the University of Tasmania